Fengshan station, is a railway station on the Taiwan Railways Administration Pingtung line located in Fongshan District, Kaohsiung City, Taiwan.

The station is located about 700 meters, or 2300 feet northeast of the Kaohsiung MRT Fengshan Station.

History

In 1935, a brick station building replaced the original wooden station building, and was expanded twice in 1964 and 1990. The station tracks were electrified between 3 May 1995 (from Kaohsiung to Fongshan) and 10 July 1996 (from Fongshan to Pingtung). Until 1998, this station was also served by the South-North line (zh:南北平行預備線) of Taiwan Sugar Railways.

A temporary, underground station building was opened on 22 June 2014 at the site of the former Taiwan Sugar Railways platforms as part of the underground relocation of tracks of the West Coast line. At the same time, the station building was demolished and rebuilt.

See also
 List of railway stations in Taiwan

References

1907 establishments in Taiwan
Railway stations in Kaohsiung
Railway stations opened in 1907
Railway stations served by Taiwan Railways Administration